The following is a complete list of books published by Anne Rice, an American author of gothic fiction, Christian literature, and erotica. She has sold nearly 100 million copies. Rice has published 37 novels, including four under the pen name A.N. Roquelaure, two under the pen name Anne Rampling, two with her son, Christopher Rice, and one non-fiction book.

Novels

Nonfiction

References

Bibliographies by writer
Bibliographies of American writers